The Churchill River is a major river in Alberta, Saskatchewan and Manitoba, Canada. It was named after John Churchill, 1st Duke of Marlborough and governor of the Hudson's Bay Company from 1685 to 1691.

The Cree name for the river is Missinipi, meaning "big waters".

The Denesuline name for the river is des nëdhë́, meaning "Great River".

The river is located entirely within the Canadian Shield. The drainage basin includes a number of lakes in Central-East Alberta which flow into a series of lakes in Saskatchewan and Manitoba. The main tributary, the Beaver River, joins at Lac Île-à-la-Crosse.

Nistowiak Falls—the tallest falls in Saskatchewan—are on the Rapid River, which flows north, out of Lac la Ronge into Nistowiak Lake on the Churchill just north of La Ronge.

A large amount of flow of the Churchill River after Manitoba–Saskatchewan border comes from the Reindeer River, which flows from Wollaston and Reindeer lakes. Flow from Reindeer Lake is regulated by the Whitesand Dam. From there, the Churchill River flows east through a series of lakes (Highrock, Granville, Southern Indian and Gauer), then flows via a diversion for hydro-electric generation into the Nelson River (60% of flow), and the rest flows as the Churchill River into Hudson Bay at Churchill, Manitoba (see also Nelson River Hydroelectric Project).

History 
The Churchill formed a major part of the "voyageur highway" in the 18th to 20th centuries after Dene people showed Peter Pond the Methye Portage which connects the Hudson Bay watershed with the Clearwater – Athabasca – MacKenzie rivers which flow to the Arctic Ocean. See Canadian Canoe Routes (early).

Fish species
The Churchill is also home of several fish species including: walleye, sauger, yellow perch, northern pike, lake trout, lake whitefish, cisco, white sucker, shorthead redhorse, longnose sucker, lake sturgeon and burbot.

Hydroelectric developments

Island Falls 
The only operating hydroelectric generating station on the Churchill River is Island Falls, with a capacity of 111 megawatts (MW). The purpose of the Whitesand Dam mentioned above is to control the amount of water flowing through Island Falls, since the generating station is downstream of the Reindeer River fork.

Wintego Hydroelectric Project 
In the 1970s, SaskPower was considering building another hydroelectric station on the Churchill River called Wintego. The project was expected to cost $338 million (equivalent to $1.3 billion in 2020), including transmission and roads, and the capacity of the station would have been 300 MW.

The cost estimate assumes a 50-year lifespan, but the lifespans of SaskPower's other hydroelectric stations have been proven to be much longer (such as 90 years for Island Falls). Construction of Wintego would also enable the output of Island Falls to increase by 70 MW, and this benefit is not included in the cost estimate above.

Other Saskatchewan 
Two other potential hydroelectric developments between the Reindeer River Fork and Island Falls are the Iskwatam Generating Station and the Pita Generating Station, with unknown MW capacities.

Manitoba 
In Manitoba, the Bonald and Granville Falls generating stations could produce 110 MW and 120 MW, respectively.

Gallery

See also
List of rivers of Manitoba
List of rivers of Saskatchewan
Hudson Bay drainage basin
North American fur trade
List of longest rivers of Canada

References

External links

 Saskatchewan's Churchill River, Canadian Parks and Wilderness Society
 Saskatchewan Documented Canoe Routes, Canoe Saskatchewan website
 Fish Species of Saskatchewan
 Encyclopedia of Saskatchewan

Rivers of Northern Manitoba
Rivers of Saskatchewan
Churchill, Manitoba
Tributaries of Hudson Bay